Falcuna is a genus of butterflies in the family Lycaenidae. Falcuna is endemic to the Afrotropical realm.

Species
Falcuna campimus (Holland, 1890)
Falcuna dorotheae Stempffer & Bennett, 1963
Falcuna gitte Bennett, 1969
Falcuna hollandi (Aurivillius, 1895)
Falcuna iturina Stempffer & Bennett, 1963
Falcuna kasai Stempffer & Bennett, 1963
Falcuna lacteata Stempffer & Bennett, 1963
Falcuna leonensis Stempffer & Bennett, 1963
Falcuna libyssa (Hewitson, 1866)
Falcuna lybia (Staudinger, [1892])
Falcuna margarita (Suffert, 1904)
Falcuna melandeta (Holland, 1893)
Falcuna orientalis (Bethune-Baker, 1906)
Falcuna overlaeti Stempffer & Bennett, 1963
Falcuna reducta Stempffer & Bennett, 1963
Falcuna semliki Stempffer & Bennett, 1963
Falcuna synesia (Hulstaert, 1924)

References

Poritiinae
Lycaenidae genera